Satupaitea is a large village district with four sub-villages on the south east coast of Savaii Island in Samoa.

In the country's modern political divisions, Satupaitea is also a Political District (Itumalo), one of 11 in the country, which now includes the traditional area of Salega.

Satupaitea village enclave
The four villages in Satupaitea village enclave are Moasula, Pitonuu, Satufia and Vaega. The total population of Satupa'itea village enclave is 2112.

Satupaitea Political District
In modern politics, Satupaitea district incorporates the larger traditional area of Salega (population 3,461).

Geographically, the district consists of two divisions separated by Palauli district.

The paramount chiefly title of the district is Tonumaipea, with special relevance in the Alataua sub-district (the western half of the district).

19th century Methodist mission
During the 19th century, Satupaitea was an important stronghold for the early Methodist mission in Samoa. The English Methodist missionary George Brown (1835–1917) arrived in Samoa in 1860 and lived with his wife Lydia in Satupa'itea. They lived in a bamboo hut for the first two years and later constructed a mission house. In 1863, Brown began to train teachers at Satupa'itea for the ministry. The 'training' for the Methodist ministry was later established, in 1868, at Lufilufi on the north coast of Upolu island as the Piula Theological College.

Electoral results

References

 
Districts of Samoa
Enclaves and exclaves
Methodist missions